{{DISPLAYTITLE:C2H6O4S}}
The molecular formula C2H6O4S (molar mass: 126.13 g/mol, exact mass: 125.9987 u) may refer to:

 Ethyl sulfate, also known as sulfovinic acid
 Isethionic acid
 Dimethyl sulfate (DMS)